Carley Thomas (born 26 December 2000) is an Australian athlete. She competed in the women's 800 metres event at the 2019 World Athletics Championships.

References

External links

2000 births
Living people
Australian female middle-distance runners
Place of birth missing (living people)
World Athletics Championships athletes for Australia